Djibouti–Yemen relations are bilateral relations between Djibouti and Yemen. Diplomatic ties between the two fellow Arab League members are strong, and cooperation takes place on many levels. The Bridge of the Horns, a project linking both territories, has also been tabled.

See also
Foreign relations of Djibouti
Foreign relations of Yemen

References

 
Yemen
Bilateral relations of Yemen